Chrysodeixis subsidens (Australian cabbage looper) is a moth of the family Noctuidae. It is found in Australia.

The wingspan is ca. 30 mm.

The larvae feed on various plants, including Cabbage, Brassica, Tomato, Solanaceae and Silver Beet.

External links
detailed species info

Plusiinae
Moths described in 1858